Steven Kokelj is a Canadian environmental scientist.
Meagan Wohlberg, writing in the Northern Journal, called him NWT's foremost expert on permafrost.

Kokelj's PhD thesis, published in 2003, was entitled, "Near-surface Ground Ice in Sediments of the Mackenzie Delta Region, Northwest Territories".
Since then Kokelj has held several research positions in the Northwest Territories.

In 2014 Kokelj was the very first speaker invited to lead off a series of talks on Northern issues, hosted in NWT's legislative assembly.  
The talks were modeled after the TED conferences, and the legislature has made them available via podcast.

Publications

References 

Living people
Canadian naturalists
University of Ottawa alumni
Carleton University alumni
Canadian geologists
Year of birth missing (living people)